The 1985 Federation Cup was the 23rd edition of the most important competition between national teams in women's tennis.  The tournament was held at the Nagoya Green Tennis Club in Nagoya, Japan, from 6–14 October.  Czechoslovakia defeated the United States in the final, giving Czechoslovakia their 4th and 3rd consecutive title.

Qualifying round
All ties were played at the Nagoya Green Tennis Club in Nagoya, Japan, on hard courts.

Winning nations advance to Main Draw, losing nations play in Consolation rounds.

South Korea vs. Philippines

Chinese Taipei vs. Finland

China vs. Indonesia

Norway vs. Chile

Ireland vs. Thailand

Belgium vs. Uruguay

Main draw

1st Round losing teams play in Consolation rounds

First round

Czechoslovakia vs. Greece

Netherlands vs. Switzerland

Belgium vs. Hungary

Canada vs. Sweden

West Germany vs. Great Britain

Austria vs. Japan

Bulgaria vs. Soviet Union

Ireland vs. Yugoslavia

United States vs. South Korea

Brazil vs. China

Argentina vs. Peru

New Zealand vs. France

Italy vs. Chinese Taipei

Mexico vs. Norway

Spain vs. Hong Kong

Denmark vs. Australia

Second round

Czechoslovakia vs. Switzerland

Hungary vs. Canada

Great Britain vs. Japan

Bulgaria vs. Yugoslavia

United States vs. China

Argentina vs. New Zealand

Italy vs. Mexico

Spain vs. Australia

Quarterfinals

Czechoslovakia vs. Hungary

Great Britain vs. Bulgaria

United States vs. Argentina

Italy vs. Australia

Semifinals

Czechoslovakia vs. Bulgaria

United States vs. Australia

Final

Czechoslovakia vs. United States

Consolation rounds

Draw

First round

Soviet Union vs. Austria

Chile vs. Greece

Norway vs. Hong Kong

Netherlands vs. Denmark

Indonesia vs. Brazil

Belgium vs. Thailand

Second round

France vs. Uruguay

Chinese Taipei vs. Soviet Union

West Germany vs. Greece

Finland vs. Hong Kong

Netherlands vs. Ireland

Brazil vs. Peru

Belgium vs. Philippines

South Korea vs. Sweden

Quarterfinals

France vs. Soviet Union

West Germany vs. Hong Kong

Netherlands vs. Brazil

Philippines vs. South Korea

Semifinals

Soviet Union vs. West Germany

Brazil vs. South Korea

Final

Soviet Union vs. South Korea

References

Billie Jean King Cups by year
Federation
Tennis tournaments in Japan
Sports competitions in Nagoya
Federation Cup
1985 in women's tennis
1985 in Japanese women's sport